Jerzy Maria Kirchmayer (1895–1959) was a Polish historian and military commander, a brigadier general of the Polish Army and one of the first historians of the Warsaw Uprising of 1944.

Life

Jerzy Kirchmayer was born on 29 August 1895 in Kraków, then in Austro-Hungarian Galicia. After graduating from a local trade school in Lwów (now Lviv, Ukraine), he attended a notable Jesuit gymnasium in Chyrów. After graduating in 1914 he went for vacations to Russian-held part of Poland, where he was caught by the outbreak of World War I. Arrested by the Russians as a citizen of Austria-Hungary, Kirchmayer was interned and sent to mainland Russia. There he was allowed to join the Polish 3rd Corps in the East, with which he returned to Poland in December 1918. Together with the remnants of his unit he joined the Polish Army and served with distinction in the 7th Regiment of Artillery during the Polish-Bolshevik War.

After the war he remained in the army and graduated from an artillery NCO school in 1921. The following year his military grade was revised to Second Lieutenant and in 1924 he graduated from Toruń military academy, receiving the grade of first lieutenant. Simultaneously, between 1921 and 1930 he served at various posts in 3rd and 16th Field Artillery Regiments. Between 1924 and 1926 he also served in the Artillery Bureau of the French Military Mission to Poland. In 1930 he was promoted to captain and after two years he was attached to the headquarters of the Polish 13th Infantry Division as the deputy commander of artillery. In 1936 he was promoted to major and before the outbreak of World War II he was assigned to the Toruń Army Inspectorate.

During the Polish Defensive War of 1939, Kirchmayer served as the deputy Chief of Operations of the Pomorze Army. After the battle of Bzura he broke through with his forces to Warsaw, receiving heavy wounds during the battles in Kampinos Forest. He avoided being captured by the Germans and joined the ZWZ resistance organization, later reformed into Home Army. In 1942 he was promoted to lieutenant colonel. During his service as the Chief of Staff of the Warsaw-Voivodship Home Army Area he lost his leg in one of the actions. Transferred to Eastern Poland for recovery, he was caught up by the Soviet offensive and in July 1944 he joined the 1st Polish Army under Gen. Zygmunt Berling. He was accepted as the chief of Military Historical Office, and later he headed the chief of Historical Division of the General Staff of the Polish Army. His grade was verified to colonel in 1945 and in 1947 he also served as a special officer of the Chief of Staff.

Later the same year he was promoted to brigadier general and assigned to the Academy of General Staff in Warsaw, where he served as a tutor and a deacon. However, the following year his service in the Home Army was discovered by his superiors and Kirchmayer was dismissed from the army. In 1950 he was arrested by the Urząd Bezpieczeństwa and the following year he was sentenced to life imprisonment under false accusations of espionage and conspiracy during the so-called Trial of the Generals. He spent four years in various communist prison camps in Poland. During the short political thaw in October 1955 he was released from prison and rehabilitated in April 1956, but his health never fully recovered. He was not allowed to join the army and joined the Historical Institute of the Polish Academy of Sciences. He died on 11 April 1959 in Otwock and was buried in Powązki Military Cemetery in Warsaw.

Works

See also
List of Poles

1895 births
1959 deaths
20th-century Polish historians
Polish male non-fiction writers
Burials at Powązki Military Cemetery
Polish People's Army generals
Recipients of the Order of the Cross of Grunwald, 3rd class
Warsaw Uprising
Military personnel from Kraków
People detained by the Polish Ministry of Public Security
Writers from Kraków